People from Oxford are the human population of Oxford, England.

People from Oxford may also refer to:
List of University of Oxford people
University of Oxford#Notable alumni
List of people from Oxford, Mississippi, U.S.
:Category:People from Oxford, England
:Category:People from Oxford, Alabama
:Category:People from Oxford, Maine
:Category:People from Oxford County, Maine
:Category:People from Oxford, New York

See also
Oxford (disambiguation)